Clathrina cancellata is a species of calcareous sponge from the United States. The species name is derived from a Latin word meaning "latticed".

References

World Register of Marine Species entry

Clathrina
Fauna of the United States
Animals described in 1873
Fauna without expected TNC conservation status